The traditional shifting cultivation farming technique of indigenous communities and Bengalis in the Chittagong Hill Tracts in Bangladesh and nearby regions in Arunachal Pradesh, Mizoram, and Nagaland in India is known as jhum cultivation.

Technique and crops 
In the month of January, the jhummias cut down the forest on the slope of the hill. Afterwards, they clean the land and dry the wood, bamboo and plants they have cut down in the sun. Later around March–April, the dried material is burnt and made suitable for jhum cultivation. 

Next, in the Bengali month of Baishakh and Jyeshtha (around May), jhummias dig holes in the burnt jhum soil and sow different types of seeds, including paddy, marfa, sweet pumpkin, cotton, sesame, and maize, which are cultivated several mon the later, depending on the particular crop.

Jhum cultivation does not take place in some years due to drought. Yields are expected to be huge if there is no infestation of rats and other insects.

Jhum cultivation requires that farmers move their plots from year to year to allow the land to recover. Previously, natural forests of the hills were kept uncultivated for a long time. In recent times, however, the uncultivated period has been dangerously reduced from the traditional ten years to two to three years. This is due to depletion of agricultural land and loss of available land due to population pressure, the Kaptai reservoir, and large-scale non-tribal settlement.

Drawbacks 
Jhum cultivation causes extensive damage to the environment. Harmful effects of jhum cultivation include loss of soil fertility, soil erosion, deforestation, destruction of wildlife habitat, and flooding of rivers and lakes. As a result, production declines so much that a Jhummia family cannot survive in one place. The most widely followed minimum seven to eight-year cycle is currently reduced to three to four years which is not at all sufficient. Due to these reasons, the crop yield has now declined at a huge rate, making it critical to devise suitable alternatives to jhum cultivation.

See also 
 Shifting cultivation
 Slash-and-burn

References 

Geography of South Asia